Payena ferruginea is a tree in the family Sapotaceae. The bark is dark brown to grey. Inflorescences bear up to nine flowers. The specific epithet  is from the Latin meaning "rust-coloured", referring to the indumentum. The timber is used commercially. Habitat is mostly mixed dipterocarp forests from sea-level to  altitude. P. ferruginea is endemic to Borneo.

References

ferruginea
Endemic flora of Borneo
Trees of Borneo
Plants described in 1997